Tommy Haas was the defending champion, and won in the final 6–3, 6–2, against Andy Roddick.

Seeds

Draw

Finals

Top half

Bottom half

External links
Draw
Qualifying draw

Singles
2007 ATP Tour